The King's Christmas Message (also known as The Queen's Christmas Message in the reign of a female monarch, formally as His Majesty's Most Gracious Speech, and informally as the Royal Christmas Message) is a broadcast made by the sovereign of the United Kingdom and the other Commonwealth realms to the Commonwealth of Nations each year at Christmas. The tradition began in 1932 with a radio broadcast by King George V via the British Broadcasting Corporation's Empire Service. The message is broadcast on television, radio, and the Internet via various providers. It is usually broadcast at 15:00 GMT (3:00 PM) on Christmas Day.

History

The idea for a Christmas message from the sovereign to the British Empire was first proposed by the founding director-general of the British Broadcasting Corporation (BBC), John Reith, in 1922 when he approached King George V about making a short broadcast on the newly created radio service. The King declined, however, believing that radio was mainly an entertainment. Reith approached the King again ten years later, in 1932, as a way to inaugurate the Empire Service (now the World Service) and the King finally agreed after being encouraged to do so by Queen Mary and Prime Minister Ramsay MacDonald. That year, King George V read the first Royal Christmas Message, which was scripted by Rudyard Kipling; the King was originally hesitant about using the relatively untested medium of radio, but was reassured after a summertime visit to the BBC and agreed to carry out the concept and read the speech from a temporary studio set up at Sandringham House. The 1934 Christmas broadcast was introduced from Ilmington Manor by 65-year-old Walton Handy, a local shepherd, with carols from the church choir and the bells ringing from the town church, and reached an estimated 20 million people in Australia, Canada, India, Kenya, South Africa and the United Kingdom.

While his brother, King Edward VIII, abdicated just before his first Christmas as king, King George VI continued his father's Christmas broadcasts; it was in his 1939 reading delivered in the opening stages of the Second World War that he uttered the famous lines: "I said to the man who stood at the Gate of the Year, 'Give me a light that I may tread safely into the unknown.' And he replied, 'Go out into the darkness, and put your hand into the Hand of God. That shall be to you better than light, and safer than a known way.'"

For many years, the King's speech came at the end of an hour-long broadcast of greeting from various parts of the British Empire and Commonwealth which typically included interviews with ordinary people of many occupations such as an innkeeper in an English village, a miner in South Africa, and a lifeguard in Australia with the King's speech serving as a bond tying the Commonwealth together.

George's daughter and successor, Queen Elizabeth II, gave her first Christmas message to the Commonwealth of Nations from her study at Sandringham House, at 3:07 PM on 25 December 1952, some 10 months after her father's death. Five years later, the message was broadcast on television for the first time. It has been an annual television broadcast every year since, with the exception of 1969: that year, no message was given because a special documentary film, Royal Family, had been produced during the summer in connection with the investiture of the Prince of Wales. It was therefore decided not to do a broadcast at Christmas, but the Queen issued a written message instead.
 Until 1996, the Christmas broadcast was always produced by the BBC; the monopoly was ended when it was announced that, from 1997, the message would be produced and broadcast alternately by the BBC and its main rival, Independent Television News (ITN), with a biennial rotation. It was reported by The Daily Telegraph that this decision was made after the BBC decided to screen an interview with Diana, Princess of Wales, on its current affairs programme Panorama. This was denied by Buckingham Palace which said the new arrangements "reflect the composition of the television and radio industries today". Beginning in 2011, Sky News was added to the rotation.

Sky News recorded the Queen's Christmas message for Christmas 2012, the Queen's Diamond Jubilee year, and for the first time it was recorded in 3D. Buckingham Palace are reported to have explained: "We wanted to do something a bit different and special in this Jubilee year, so doing it for the first time in 3D seemed a good thing, technology wise, to do."

Under the reign of Queen Elizabeth II, the themes and direction of the speech were decided by the Queen and the text was largely written by the Queen herself, sometimes with assistance from Prince Philip  and her staff. In the later years of her reign, the speech became more personal and religious in tone.

Traditionally, the message begins with the British national anthem God Save The King.

Broadcast

The message typically combines a chronicle of that year's major events, with specific focus on the Commonwealth of Nations, and with the sovereign's own personal milestones and feelings on Christmas. It is one of the few instances when the sovereign speaks publicly without advice from any ministers of the Crown in any of the monarch's realms. Planning for each year's address begins months earlier, when the monarch establishes a theme and appropriate archival footage is collected and assembled; the actual speech is recorded a few days prior to Christmas.

Timing:

 On the internet, as in the United Kingdom, broadcast of the King's Christmas message is embargoed until 15:00 GMT on 25 December.
 New Zealand is the first country in the Commonwealth to broadcast the message over the airwaves, at 18:06 local time (5:06 am GMT) by Radio New Zealand on RNZ National, then again at 18:50 by Television New Zealand on TVNZ1.
 In Australia, the message is broadcast by the Australian Broadcasting Corporation at 15:20 local time (5:20 am to 8:20 am GMT, depending on the time zone).
 In Canada, the Canadian Broadcasting Corporation broadcasts the message generally at noon local time on CBC Television (3:30 pm to 8 pm GMT depending on the time zone), and at 11:50 am local time on CBC Radio One and CBC Music. Some private stations such as CTV also carry the speech.
 Outside of the Commonwealth, C-SPAN in the United States airs the King's Message at times that vary depending on the network's schedule. No American radio station airs the broadcast, although some areas bordering Canada can receive it via the CBC.

Messages

George V

Edward VIII
No Christmas Message as he 
abdicated in his first year of reign

George VI

1930s

1940s

1950s

Elizabeth II

1950s

1960s

1970s

1980s

1990s

2000s

2010s

2020s

Charles III

Similar messages elsewhere

In 1931, Queen Wilhelmina of the Netherlands delivered her first Christmas message on the airwaves, which was also broadcast to the Dutch East Indies, Suriname and the other Dutch West Indies via shortwave radio station PCJJ. During the reign of her daughter Juliana, the Royal Christmas Message was to become an annual tradition.

The Pope delivers a Christmas message to the world and heads of state of other countries have adopted the tradition of a message at Christmas, including the King of Sweden, the King of the Belgians, the President of Germany, and the King of Spain beginning in 1975.

Others have modified the practice by issuing a statement to coincide with the New Year; this is done by the Governors-General of Canada and New Zealand, the Queen of Denmark, the King of Norway, the King of Thailand, the Presidents of China, Finland, France, Hungary, Italy, the Philippines, Poland, Portugal, and the Russian Federation, as well as the Chancellor of Germany. The Archbishop of Canterbury, spiritual leader of the Anglican Communion, also gives a New Year's Day speech. The British Prime Minister issues a short Christmas message and the Prime Minister's New Year Message which extensively reflects on the last year and the governments intentions in the new year.

The Prime Minister of Canada records a short Christmas greeting.

The Yang di-Pertuan Agong of Malaysia makes speeches on his official birthday in June and on National Heroes Day in July, while the Prime Minister of Malaysia also makes speeches not only on New Year's Day but also on the night of Eid ul-Fitr and on the eve of Independence Day. The Prime Minister of Singapore gives his speech on this occasion and on the National Day of Singapore. In the past, the Governor of Hong Kong, as the representative of the British monarch, played this role; the tradition was carried on by the Chief Executive of Hong Kong upon the territory's transfer of sovereignty to China in 1997.

The President of the United States also gives out Christmas messages as part of the President's Weekly Address. Some of these messages come out within a few days before Christmas or on Christmas Day. The President may also give out Christmas message to soldiers serving in the U.S. Armed Forces. The opposition party may also give out their Christmas messages as part of their response to the President's weekly address. In addition, beginning in 1986, US President Ronald Reagan and Soviet Union general secretary Mikhail Gorbachev exchanged televised New Year's Day addresses to the other's respective nations. This exchange continued between President George H. W. Bush and Gorbachev until the
demise of the Soviet Union.

See also

 Alternative Christmas message
 Christmas Eve National Speech
 Special address by the British monarch
 Prime Minister's New Year Message
 Cadena nacional

References

External links

The Royal Family Channel on YouTube
Transcript of The Queen's Christmas Broadcast for 2013
The Royal Family and technology
A history of Christmas Broadcasts

British monarchy
Monarchy in Canada
Speeches by heads of state
1932 radio programme debuts
Canadian traditions
Annual television shows
Christmas in the United Kingdom
Annual events in the United Kingdom
Christmas in Canada